Hwang Chi-fang (born 4 January 1965) is a Taiwanese bobsledder. He competed in the two man event at the 1984 Winter Olympics.

References

1965 births
Living people
Taiwanese male bobsledders
Olympic bobsledders of Taiwan
Bobsledders at the 1984 Winter Olympics
Sportspeople from Tainan
20th-century Taiwanese people